The  is a demon-like creature in Japanese folklore.

Mythology
It is usually depicted as a kind of small oni and is thought to be able to provoke a person's darkest desires and thus instigates them into perpetrating wicked deeds. It is described to be a being with an extremely contrary nature. If they were ordered something, they would do the opposite.

One of the amanojaku's best known appearances is in the fairytale , in which a girl miraculously born from a melon is doted upon by an elderly couple. They shelter her from the outside world, and she naively lets the amanojaku inside one day, where it kidnaps or devours her, and sometimes impersonates her by wearing her flayed skin.

In religion

The creature has also entered Buddhist thought, perhaps via syncretism with the yaksha, where it is considered an opponent of Buddhist teachings. It is commonly depicted as being trampled on and subdued into righteousness by Bishamonten or one of the other Shitennō.

In popular culture
 In the manga Nura: Rise of the Yokai Clan, an amanojaku named Awashima is revealed to be male during the day and female at night.
 In the manga Urotsukidōji, Amano Jyaku is the titular protagonist.
 In the anime Ghost Stories, an amanojaku is accidentally sealed inside the protagonist's pet cat in the first episode. It becomes part of the main cast for the rest of the series.
 In the Touhou Project video game Double Dealing Character, the stage 5 boss is an amanojaku named Seija Kijin who has the ability to turn things over. Seija is also the protagonist in the spin-off sequel, Impossible Spell Card.
 In the spin-off ZUN made for a Comic-con in Japan, Gold Rush, Seija Kijin is also the protagonist. However, ZUN never released the game to the public.
 In the game Shin Megami Tensei, an amanojaku kills and eats the protagonist's mother and impersonates her.
 There is a Tokyo-based taiko group called "Taiko Shūdan Amanojaku".
 In the movie "Ten Nights of Dreams" based on Natsume Soseki's novel, there is an Amanojaku that provokes the woman in the Fifth Night.
 In the musical series "The Story of the Kitsune and the Demon"/"狐と鬼の話" (commonly referred to as "The Onibi series") by Japanese music producer -MASA Works DESIGN- there is a character named Shikyou (死凶) who is an Amanojaku that serves as the series antagonist.
 In the anime Dororo the main characters encounter the Amanojaku in episode 14 of the 1969 series and episode 19 of the 2019 series.
 In the book series "Shadow of the Fox" by Julie Kagawa, amanjaku are tiny demons fighting against the main protagonists.
 In Kamen Rider Saber web-movie Kamen Rider Saber Spin-off: Kamen Rider Sabela & Kamen Rider Durendal, the main antagonist Rui Mitarai assume a Megid form called Amanojaku Megid, which is base on Amanojaku it self.

See also

References

Yōmi Hyaku Monogatari: Amanojaku
Bake Bake Zukan: Amanojaku 
Gogen Yurai Jiten: Amanojaku
Dictionary of Pandaemonium: Amanosagume 
Japanese Buddhism Photo Dictionary: Jyaki Demons
Shiten'nō Zō no Ohanashi

External links
Fujino Bunraku 2001 (contains mythological information and images)

Oni
Yōkai